was a Japanese entertainer and actor.

Katō starred in the long-running TV series Ōoka Echizen (1970~2006).

Overviews 

The son of an elementary school principal, Katō studied literature and theatre. As an actor, he made his film debut in 1964. Katō rose in popularity through his role as Toshiro Mifune's son in Samurai Rebellion. He performed some of his most famous roles in films directed by Kei Kumai, such as The Long Darkness (1972), Cape of North (1976) and Death of a Tea Master (1989).

Katō played the lead role in two Taiga dramas, Kaze to Kumo to Niji to (1976) and Shishi no jidai (1980).

He died on 18 June 2018.

Films 

The Scent of Incense (1964) - Ezaki
Sword of the Beast (1965) - Jurata Yamane
Samurai Rebellion (1967) - Yogoro Sasahara
Shinobu Kawa (1972) - Tetsuro
Long Journey into Love (1973) - Yōzō
Castle of Sand (1974) - Eiryo Waga
Cape of North (1976) - Mitsuo
Bandits vs. Samurai Squadron (1978) - Okubo Sadonokami
Big Joys, Small Sorrows (1986) - Yoshiaki Fujita
Death of a Tea Master (1989) - Oribe Furuta
Bloom in the Moonlight (1993) - Yoshihiro Taki
Anne no Nikki (1995) - Otto Frank
The Unbroken (2009) - the Prime Minister Yasushi Tonegawa
The Great Passage (2013) - Tomosuke Matsumoto
Color Me True (2018) - old Kenji (his final role)

TV dramas
Kenkaku Shōbai (1973) - Akiyama Daijirō
Ōoka Echizen (1970-1999, TBS) - Ōoka Tadasuke
Kaze to Kumo to Niji to (1976, NHK) - Taira no Masakado
Sekigahara (1981, TBS) - Ishida Mitsunari
Sosa Kenji Ukon Makoto no Satsujin Chosho (June 10, 2000, TV Asahi) - Makoto Ukon
Sosa Kenji Ukon Makoto no Satsujin Chosho 2 (December 9, 2000, TV Asahi) - Makoto Ukon
Sosa Kenji Ukon Makoto no Satsujin Chosho 3 (2005) - Makoto Ukon
Saka no Ue no Kumo (2009-2011, NHK) - Itō Hirobumi
Yuriko-san no Ehon (2016, NHK) - Nobutsuna Sasaki
Ōoka Echizen (2016, NHK) - Kazama Gorōzaemon

Honours 
Medal with Purple Ribbon (2001)
Order of the Rising Sun, 4th Class, Gold Rays with Rosette (2008)

References

External links
Profile at Haiyuza (in Japanese)

1938 births
2018 deaths
Japanese entertainers
Japanese male film actors
Japanese male television actors
People from Shizuoka Prefecture
Taiga drama lead actors
Recipients of the Medal with Purple Ribbon
Recipients of the Order of the Rising Sun, 4th class
Waseda University alumni
Deaths from cancer in Japan
Deaths from gallbladder cancer